The list of shipwrecks in July 1828 includes all ships sunk, foundered, grounded, or otherwise lost during July 1828.

2 July

9 July

10 July

13 July

14 July

16 July

18 July

19 July

22 July

30 July

Unknown date

References

1828-07